Just Out of Reach may refer to:

 Just Out of Reach, a 1975 album by Perry Como
 "Just Out of Reach" (song), a 1965 song by the Zombies
 "Just Out of Reach (Of My Two Open Arms)", a popular song
 Just Out of Reach (film), a 1979 film
 "Just Out of Reach", a song by The Jesus and Mary Chain, from Barbed Wire Kisses
 "Just Out of Reach", a 2014 song by Mayday Parade from Black Lines

See also
 Out of Reach (disambiguation)